Riyadh Season is a state-sponsored annual entertainment and sports festival, part of the larger Saudi Seasons initiative held since 2019 from October to March during winter in Riyadh, Saudi Arabia.

Overview
First unveiled by the General Entertainment Authority in accordance with the Saudi Vision 2030 in October 2019, the festival brought unprecedented sports and entertainment themes in Riyadh.

According to the chairman of the General Entertainment Authority, the government generated 6 billion Saudi Riyals in revenues from the first edition of the festival in 2019. After maximizing the capacity in the second edition in 2021, the opening ceremony of the festival was attended by 750,000 people in the boulevard district, which included a parade, fireworks and a concert by Pitbull.

Riyadh Season 2019
The first edition of the festival was launched on 11 October 2019 and was set to end on 15 December, but it was extended to January 2020 after the number of visitors exceeded 10 million. It included 100 events that took place at 12 different zones:

 Riyadh Boulevard
 Riyadh Front
 Riyadh Car Exhibition
 Riyadh Winter Wonderland
 Riyadh Sports Arenas
 Diplomatic Quarters
 Al-Murabaa
 Al-Malazz
 Wadi Namar
 Riyadh Beat
 Riyadh Safari
 Riyadh Sahara

Riyadh Season 2021
The second edition of Riyadh Season was launched on 20 October 2021 and lasted until the end of March 2022. It lies in an area measuring 5.4 million square meters in which it hosts more than 7,000 events at 14 different zones.

 Riyadh Boulevard
 Via Riyadh
 Combat Field
 Riyadh Winter Wonderland
 Riyadh Front
 Al-Murabaa
 Riyadh Safari
 Al-Athriyah
 Riyadh Oasis
 The Groves
 Nabd al-Riyadh
 Zaman Village
 al-Salam Tree
 Khalooha

Riyadh Season 2022
The third edition of Riyadh Season was launched on 21 October 2022 and is currently ongoing, set to end in March 2023. This includes 8,500 activity days. This season will have a principal of 15 zones in the Riyadh Boulevard and represent many cultures such as:
 America
 France
 Greece
 Italy
 India
 China 
 Spain
 Morocco
 Mexico.

The 2022 Riyadh Season also included Riyadh Season Cup, a friendly football match between Paris Saint-Germain (PSG) and Riyadh XI (combined Al Hilal and Al Nassr all-star team) held at King Fahd International Stadium on 19 January 2023. The game received global attention as the game pitted Lionel Messi and Cristiano Ronaldo, two of the greatest football players in the world and the subject of intense debate, directly against each other for the first time since 2020, as Messi plays for PSG and Ronaldo recently joined Al Nassr days prior to the friendly match. PSG won the match 5-4.

See also
 @HACK, a cybersecurity and hacking convention that annually is held during Riyadh Season.

References

2019 establishments in Saudi Arabia
Festivals established in 2019
Annual events in Saudi Arabia
Festivals in Saudi Arabia
Season
Season